Sean Lewis (born April 11, 1986) is an American football coach. He is the offensive coordinator at the University of Colorado Boulder. He served as head football coach at Kent State University from 2018 to 2022. Lewis played college football at Wisconsin. Following the 2022 season, he was hired at Colorado under new head coach Deion Sanders.

Head coaching record

References

External links
 Kent State profile

1986 births
Living people
American football return specialists
American football tight ends
Akron Zips football coaches
Bowling Green Falcons football coaches
Colorado Buffaloes football coaches
Eastern Illinois Panthers football coaches 
Kent State Golden Flashes football coaches
Nebraska–Omaha Mavericks football coaches
Syracuse Orange football coaches
Wisconsin Badgers football players
High school football coaches in Illinois